Alfred Schmidt may refer to:

Alfred Schmidt (architect) (1892-1965), German architect
Alfred Schmidt (artist) (1858–1938), Danish illustrator and painter
Alfred Schmidt (philosopher) (1931–2012), German philosopher and sociologist
Alfred Schmidt (footballer) (1935–2016), German football soccer player
Alfred Schmidt (water polo) (born 1957), Mexican Olympic water polo player
Alfred Schmidt (weightlifter) (1898–1972), Estonian weightlifter